is a Japanese actor who specializes in voice acting. Inspired by voice acting by Kappei Yamaguchi, Tachibana decided to become a voice actor himself, which he later accomplished through connections from his father's theater company. Some of his noteworthy roles include Jin Mori in The God of High School, Eisaku Ohtomo in Aoashi, and Sōjirō Sakuraba in Fanfare of Adolescence.

Biography
Tatsumaru Tachibana was born in Fukui Prefecture on April 21, 1991. Im kindergarten, Tachibana watched Kappei Yamaguchi perform the male version of Ranma Saotome in Ranma ½, which inspired Tachibana to pursue voice acting. At the age of ten, his father founded a theater company, which is where he started acting professionally. Tachibana later used the connections he earned from this work to become a voice actor.

Filmography

TV anime
2019
 Welcome to Demon School! Iruma-kun as Atori
 Case File nº221: Kabukicho as Toratarō Kobayashi

2020
 The God of High School as Jin Mori

2021
 World Trigger as Yukata Kashio
 Kageki Shojo!! as Male Students
 The Fruit of Evolution as Shota Takamiya
 Blue Period as Utashima

2022
 Kotaro Lives Alone as Tasuku
 Fanfare of Adolescence as Sōjirō Sakuraba
 Aoashi as Eisaku Ohtomo
 Lucifer and the Biscuit Hammer as Animus

2023
 Fate/strange Fake: Whispers of Dawn as Jester Karture

TBA
 Uzumaki as Tsumura

Video games
2020
 Caravan Stories as Pitsch Arbouris

2021
 The Caligula Effect 2 as the male protagonist

Musicals
2016
 Fushigi Yûgi as Chichiri

2018
 Norn9 as Akito Shukuri
 Sengoku Basara as Yamanaka Yukimori

2019
 Collar × Malice as Takeru Sasazuka

References

External links
 Official agency profile 
 

1991 births
Living people
Japanese male musical theatre actors
Japanese male video game actors
Japanese male voice actors
Male voice actors from Fukui Prefecture
21st-century Japanese male actors